Ana Cristina Coto (born October 17, 1990) is an American actress, best known for playing the lead role of Sarah Morris in the film Ouija.

Life and career 
Coto was born in Puerto Rico, to Cuban parents. She later moved to Miami with her parents, and was raised there.

In 2014, Coto played the lead role of Sarah Morris in the supernatural horror film Ouija along with Olivia Cooke. Stiles White directed the film, which released on October 24, 2014, by Universal Pictures.

In 2015, Coto appeared as a guest in the comedy television series Comedy Bang! Bang! as Kelly Mulligan.

Coto plays the titular role in the upcoming dramatic short film, "The Sleeping Life Of Sofia." In the film, Coto plays Sofia Morales, a lonely painter who sleeps to escape her depression.

TikTok 
As of April 2021, Coto has 2.1 million followers on the short video sharing platform TikTok. In late April 2020, she gained fame on the platform for a viral video of her roller skating to the song "Jenny from the Block" by Jennifer Lopez. The video is credited for reviving the hobby of roller skating, as TikTok users made use of empty parking lots and streets left by the decreased traffic of the COVID-19 pandemic to join the trend.

Filmography

Film

Television

References

External links 
 

Living people
American film actresses
American television actresses
Hispanic and Latino American actresses
21st-century American actresses
1990 births